Epic Brewing Company is a brewing company located in Otahuhu, Auckland, New Zealand. Epic beers are contract brewed at Steam Brewing Company. Their beers have won several awards in New Zealand and Australia.

In October 2007, Steam Brewing Company sold the Epic Brewing Company and Epic brand to Head Brewer / General Manager, Luke Nicholas. The Epic beers will continue being brewed at Steam Brewing Company.

Epic Brewing Company started exporting to Australia in May 2009, to the United States and Sweden in 2010 and to Belgium and Italy in 2011.

Nicholas was invited by Sam Calagione of Dogfish Head Brewery to brew a beer with him for the Discovery Channel series Brew Masters, where the duo concocted a beer called Portamarillo, brewed with pohutukawa wood-smoked Tamarillo fruit.

In 2011, Kelly Ryan joined Epic and the two travelled around New Zealand, filming NZ Craft Beer TV, during which they visited 44 breweries around New Zealand. This show resulted in a collaborative recipe that they thought captured the current state of New Zealand brewing, a 6% New Zealand Pale Ale called Mash Up. Collaborating breweries were allowed input into the recipe and invited along for the brew day.

2011 also saw the release of Epic Hop Zombie, an 8.5% Double IPA, Epic LARGER, an 8.5% Imperial Pilsner and the first beer in their new Epicurean series, a Coffee & Fig Imperial Oatmeal Stout at 8% abv.

Awards

Epic Armageddon IPA
Gold & Best in Class - 2015 Australian International Beer Awards
Gold & Best in Class - 2011 BrewNZ Beer Awards
Gold & Best in Class - 2011 BrewNZ Beer Awards
Bronze - 2010 BrewNZ Beer Awards
Gold & Best in Class - 2009 BrewNZ Beer Awards

Epic Pale Ale
Silver - 2011 BrewNZ Beer Awards
Bronze - 2009 BrewNZ Beer Awards
Gold & Best in Class - 2008 BrewNZ Beer Awards
Silver - 2007 Australian International Beer Awards
Supreme Champion Beer - 2006 New Zealand International Beer Awards.
Gold & Best in Class - 2006 New Zealand International Beer Awards
Gold & Best in Class - 2006 BrewNZ Beer Awards
Silver - 2006 Australian International Beer Awards

Epic Mayhem
Gold - 2010 BrewNZ Beer Awards
Silver - 2007 Australian International Beer Awards
Bronze - 2007 BrewNZ Beer Awards
Gold & Best in Class - 2006 BrewNZ Beer Awards

Epic Barrel Aged IPA
Bronze - 2011 BrewNZ Beer Awards
Gold & Best in Class - 2010 BrewNZ Beer Awards

Epic Porter
Silver - 2007 BrewNZ Beer Awards

Epic Lager
Silver - 2011 BrewNZ Beer Awards
Bronze - 2009 BrewNZ Beer Awards
Bronze - 2007 BrewNZ Beer Awards

Epic Thornbridge Stout
Bronze - 2011 BrewNZ Beer Awards

Oak Barrel Aged Epic Thornbridge Stout
Silver - 2011 BrewNZ Beer Awards

NZ Craft Beer TV Mash Up
Silver - 2011 BrewNZ Beer Awards

Accolades
Best Beers of Australia and New Zealand 2010 - RateBeer.com 

Best Beer 2008 - Metro Magazine 

Best Beer 2007 - NZ Listener

See also
 Barrel-aged beer

References

External links
 Epic Brewing Company

2006 establishments in New Zealand
Breweries of New Zealand